Sloan–Throneburg Farm is a historic home and farm complex located near Chesterfield, Burke County, North Carolina.  The main house was built about 1882, and is a two-story, three bay, central hall plan frame I-house.  Also on the property are the contributing landscape; Servant Dwelling, Ham House, and Wood Storage; Carriage House / Garage; Corncrib; Barn (1926); and Cave / Root Cellar.

It was listed on the National Register of Historic Places in 2002.

References

Farms on the National Register of Historic Places in North Carolina
Houses completed in 1882
Greek Revival houses in North Carolina
Houses in Burke County, North Carolina
National Register of Historic Places in Burke County, North Carolina